The 2003 Major League Baseball season ended when the Florida Marlins defeated the New York Yankees in a six-game World Series. The Detroit Tigers set the American League record for losses in a season, with 119, and the Marlins became the first team to win the championship twice as a wild card.

Managers

American League

National League

±hosted the MLB All Star Game

Standings

American League

National League

Postseason

Bracket

Note: Two teams in the same division could not meet in the division series.

Statistical leaders

Awards

Other awards
Outstanding Designated Hitter Award: David Ortiz (BOS)
Hank Aaron Award: Alex Rodriguez (TEX), American); Albert Pujols (STL), National).
Roberto Clemente Award (Humanitarian): Jamie Moyer (SEA).
Rolaids Relief Man Award: Keith Foulke (OAK, American); Éric Gagné (LAD, National).
Warren Spahn Award (Best left-handed pitcher): Andy Pettitte (NYY)

Player of the Month

Pitcher of the Month

Rookie of the Month

Home Field Attendance & Payroll

Events
 April 2 – The Detroit Tigers become the first team to have four pitchers make their Major League debut in the same game. Jeremy Bonderman, Wilfredo Ledezma, Chris Spurling and Matt Roney all played in the 8-1 loss to the Minnesota Twins.
 May 23 – During the Atlanta Braves 15-3 victory over the Cincinnati Reds, Braves players Rafael Furcal, Mark DeRosa and Gary Sheffield hit consecutive home runs to start the game.
 June 23 – Barry Bonds steals his 500th career base, becoming the only member of baseball's 500 home run/500 stolen base club

See also
2003 Nippon Professional Baseball season

References

External links
 2003 Major League Baseball season schedule at Baseball Reference

 
Major League Baseball seasons